The Irvine City Council is the governing body for the city of Irvine, California. The city operates under a council-manager form of government with a separately elected mayor and a council-appointed city manager. The council currently consists of 5 members, one of whom is the mayor. City council members serve a four-year term while the mayor serves a two-year term. Both council members and the mayor are limited to two successive terms.

Elections
Two city council members are elected at large during every presidential election while the mayor is elected during the same and during the midterm election. The other two council members are also elected during the midterms. Council members are elected to four-year terms and the mayor is elected for two-years. Both the mayor and council members are limited to two terms.

Composition
The Irvine City Council consists of 4 Democrats and 1 Republican, although per state law the council is officially nonpartisan.

References

California city councils
Irvine, California